Chapai Nawabganj-1 is a constituency represented in the Jatiya Sangsad (National Parliament) of Bangladesh since 2019 by Shamil Uddin Ahmed Shimul of the Awami League.

Boundaries 
The constituency encompasses Shibganj Upazila.

History 
The constituency was created in 1984 from the Rajshahi-1 constituency when the former Rajshahi District was split into four districts: Nawabganj, Naogaon, Rajshahi, and Natore.

Members of Parliament

Elections

Elections in the 2010s

General Election 2018

Golam Rabbani was elected unopposed in the 2014 general election after opposition parties withdrew their candidacies in a boycott of the election.

Elections in the 2000s

Elections in the 1990s

References

External links
 

Parliamentary constituencies in Bangladesh
Chapai Nawabganj District